Wilbur Bestwick (November 27, 1911 – July 10, 1972) was a United States Marine who served as the first Sergeant Major of the Marine Corps from 1957 to 1959.

Early life
Bestwick was born on November 27, 1911, in Sabetha, Kansas, and graduated from high school there in 1932.

Military career
Bestwick enlisted in the United States Marine Corps in 1934 and received his basic training at San Diego, California.

Appointed a sergeant major in 1943, he saw World War II combat with the 3rd Marine Division in the Bougainville and Guam campaigns.

On his return to the United States, in December 1944, Bestwick served as sergeant major of the Mare Island (California) Shipyard. He was transferred to San Francisco in 1945, and completed a four-year tour of duty there as sergeant major of the Marine Corps Depot of Supplies. In 1949, he became sergeant major of the Marine Corps Recruit Depot Parris Island.

During the Korean War, Bestwick joined the 1st Marine Division in Korea in October 1952 as division sergeant major, and after a year overseas returned to the States. For excellent service in Korea he was awarded the Navy Commendation Medal with Combat "V". In 1954, he began a two-year assignment as sergeant major, Inspector and Instructor Staff, 1st Air Delivery Company, San Jose, California.

Transferred to Headquarters Marine Corps, Washington, D.C., in June 1956, Bestwick served as sergeant major to the Secretary of the General Staff until May 23, 1957, when he assumed the newly established post of Sergeant Major of the Marine Corps until he retired from active duty on September 1, 1959.

Later life
Bestwick worked at Varian Associates a number of years after his service in the Marine Corps.

Bestwick died July 10, 1972, at Stanford University Hospital and according to official records, was interred at the Alta Mesa Memorial Park in Palo Alto, California. However, this was later revealed to be a mistake, and he was found to have been buried at Skylawn Memorial Park in San Mateo, California.

Awards
Bestwick's military decorations include:

References

External links
Official Marine Corps biography 

1911 births
1972 deaths
United States Marine Corps personnel of World War II
United States Marine Corps personnel of the Korean War
People from Sabetha, Kansas
Sergeants Major of the Marine Corps